Buckhorn is an unincorporated community in Berrien County, in the U.S. state of Michigan.

History
The community took its name from the Buckhorn Tavern, a local landmark  to travelers in the 1830s.

References

Unincorporated communities in Berrien County, Michigan